EnergyAustralia (formerly TRUenergy) is an electricity generation, electricity and gas retailing private company in Australia, a wholly owned subsidiary of the Hong Kong-based and listed China Light and Power (CLP Group). EnergyAustralia also had a portfolio of generating sites using thermal coal, natural gas, hydro-electric, solar energy, and wind power.

The company was founded in 1995 and its headquarters are located in Melbourne, Victoria.

History
In 2005, TXU Corp sold all its Australian assets to Singapore Power, which retained the distribution businesses (electricity and natural gas distribution networks) in Victoria, and onsold the retail and generation businesses to the Hong Kong-based CLP Group, which also owned the Yallourn Power Station, in Victoria's Latrobe Valley. In Australia, CLP traded as TRUenergy, and became the fifth largest energy retailer in Australia. In 2011, TRUenergy acquired from the New South Wales Government the state's electricity retail business and trade name of EnergyAustralia. Following the sale of the government's electricity retail assets, the government changed the name of the remainder of the government enterprise to Ausgrid, and in 2012 TRUenergy changed its name to EnergyAustralia.

In late 2011, there were media reports that TRUenergy may be floated in 2012 and later reported that this initial offering may be considered in 2013.

In July 2013, EnergyAustralia acquired Wallerawang Power Station, along with Mount Piper Power Station, both in New South Wales, from Delta Electricity for A$160 million. In November 2014, EnergyAustralia announced that it would permanently close Wallerawang due to ongoing reduced energy demand, lack of access to competitively priced coal and the power station's high operating costs. EnergyAustralia began the process of removing useful equipment from the station in 2015 and began demolition of the site when this process was completed.

On 15 May 2014, Catherine Tanna was appointed managing director of the company.

On 6 November 2015, EnergyAustralia closed its call centre in Melbourne's north-east (Mill Park) and moved jobs to the Philippines putting up to 300 jobs in doubt.

In 2018, EnergyAustralia became one of the 17 energy businesses who supported the launch of the Energy Charter, a global initiative aimed at bringing together all parts of the power supply chain to give customers more affordable and reliable energy.

On 10 March 2021, EnergyAustralia announced that it will close the Yallourn Power Station in mid-2028, four years ahead of schedule, and instead build a 350 megawatt power-generating battery in the Latrobe Valley by the end of 2026. At the time, Yallourn produced about 20% of Victoria's electricity.

Operations
EnergyAustralia supplies electricity and natural gas to more than 1.7 million residential and business customers throughout Australia.

In addition to the retail function, EnergyAustralia has a significant portfolio of industrial and commercial customers, and a A$5 billion portfolio of energy assets, including Hallett Power Station, Wallerawang Power Station (now decommissioned), and Mount Piper Power Station. It owned an underground natural gas storage facility at the Iona Gas Plant near Port Campbell until 2015.

Carbon neutral electricity
EnergyAustralia offers a carbon neutral electricity option to their customers by purchasing carbon offset units from a range of Australian and international offset projects including renewable energy projects in developing countries, land management and tree planting in Australia. Certified by the Australian Government's National Carbon Offset Standard, the carbon neutral program aims to provide carbon neutral energy to offset the amount of carbon released into the atmosphere.

Sustainability
EnergyAustralia created a climate change strategy in 2007 to define their environmental responsibilities and measure/manage their impact on the environment through their operations.

The strategy offered short, medium and long-term climate change targets and included meeting climate targets through the following measures: 
 Putting a cap on carbon intensity through stopping the building of green-field power stations using traditional coal-fired technologies
 Reducing emissions through waste management and supporting  community reduction schemes
 Investing in low and zero emission technology with support for research and development
 Helping customers manage their own footprint through energy efficient products and services, allowing them to offset emissions

Quoted as their main reduction target, greenhouse gas is aimed to be reduced by 60% by 2050, based on a 1990 emissions baseline for the National Electricity Market (NEM) and EnergyAustralia's market share of the NEM in 2050.

Proposed projects
EnergyAustralia is working on a number of projects to meet energy market demand.

Mallee Solar Park, if built, will be capable of generating emission-free electricity, providing Victoria with clean energy.

Marulan Power Station, if built, will be a gas-fired station located in New South Wales Southern Tablelands and will have a capacity of 700 MW.

Stony Gap Wind Farm is a proposed wind farm, to be located in South Australia, capable of producing 123MW, potentially saving 395,000 tonnes of greenhouse gas emissions each year.

Tallawarra Lands is a development that will aim to provide positive environmental employment and social outcomes for the Illawarra area.

Waterloo Stage 2 is a project that proposes to add 6 more wind turbines to Waterloo Wind Farm to supply enough green energy to power a further 7516 households a year. This has now been completed.

Mt Piper & Wallerawang Power Stations are set to be assisted by a number of EnergyAustralia projects to support the management of these power stations' assets.

Brown Coal Projects aim to prove new technologies and develop alternative uses for brown coal, focusing on upgrading brown coal to high-value products. Products include 'pulverised coal injection' (PCI, used in steel production), liquids, gases and chemicals. These projects also aim to provide access to land, coal supply and utilities such as water and electricity.

Two examples of projects under development that EnergyAustralia is supporting are Coal EnergyAustralia and Ignite Energy Resources. These projects have been awarded government funding of $30 million and $20 million respectively under the Advanced Lignite Demonstration Program and both projects aim to produce PCI and oil from Yallourn coal.

Energy generation and assets
EnergyAustralia's portfolio of assets includes:
 Mount Piper Power Station, New South Wales
 Tallawarra Power Station, New South Wales
 Wallerawang Power Station, New South Wales (decommissioned)
 Pine Dale Mine, New South Wales
 Yallourn Power Station, Victoria
 Cathedral Rocks Wind Farm, South Australia
 Hallett Power Station, South Australia
 Waterloo Wind Farm, South Australia

References

Electric power companies of Australia